69 Herculis is a binary star system in the northern constellation Hercules. It has the Bayer designation e Herculis, while 69 Herculis is the Flamsteed designation. This object is visible to the naked eye as a faint, white-hued star with a combined apparent visual magnitude of 4.63. The distance to this system can be estimated from parallax measurements, which yields a range of 175 light years. It is moving closer to the Earth with a heliocentric radial velocity of −10 km/s.

The magnitude 4.66 primary, designated component A, is an A-type main-sequence star with a stellar classification of A2V. It is 155 million years old with 2.12 times the mass of the Sun. The star is spinning with a projected rotational velocity of 155 km/s, which is creating an equatorial bulge that is 5% larger than the star's polar radius. It is about 2.2 times the size of the Sun and is radiating 37 times the Sun's luminosity from its photosphere at an effective temperature of 9,141 K.

X-ray emission has been detected from this system. As A-type stars are not expected to be X-ray sources, this emission is most likely coming from the companion.

References

A-type main-sequence stars
Binary stars
Hercules (constellation)
Herculis, e
Durchmusterung objects
Herculis, 069
156729
084606
6436